William Robert Beausire (born 1948) (also known Guillermo Roberto Beausire Alonso) was a British stockbroker with dual British and Chilean nationality, abducted while in transit in Buenos Aires airport in November 1974, then taken to a torture centre in Chile and never seen since. He is among the list of people deemed disappeared under the Pinochet regime.

Biography
William Beausire was a British businessman who had a British father and a Chilean mother, and had dual nationality. He and his sisters grew up in Chile.  He was abducted in Buenos Aires Ezeiza airport by plain clothed agents of the Argentine security forces on 2 November 1974, as he was on his way to France. From there he was taken to Chile to the offices of DINA, the Chilean secret police, in José Domingo Cañas Street, Santiago, where his mother and sister Diana were being interrogated, and subsequently to the Villa Grimaldi torture centre.

It is thought Beausire was a target for DINA because his sister Mary-Anne did oppose the regime, and was living with Andrés Pascal Allende, a revolutionary and leading member of the MIR, now in the underground opposition to the military regime and nephew of deposed Popular Unity Chilean president Salvador Allende. It is thought Beausire was targeted in an attempt to find out where Mary-Anne and Andres Pascal were.

Witnesses say that Beausire was given electric shocks, had sticks forced into his rectum and was hung in the air. On 17 May 1975 he was taken to another DINA centre in Irán Street, Santiago. The last anyone heard of William Beausire was on 2 July of that year, when witnesses reported seeing DINA officers taking him from a building in Irán Street, Santiago. His mother, Ines Beausire, and his sister Diana started a fruitless search for him. In June 1976 the UK Government referred the case to the United Nations. Beausire was 26 years old when he was arrested.

In 1981, his case was highlighted when featured in the BBC TV Prisoners of Conscience series, with Beausire being played by Richard Griffiths.

See also
Operation Condor
Andrés Pascal Allende
History of Chile

References

1948 births
Chilean people of British descent
British people of Chilean descent
People killed in Operation Condor
English torture victims
Military dictatorship of Chile (1973–1990)
Possibly living people